The University of Massachusetts Amherst School of Public Health and Health Sciences is a school at the University of Massachusetts Amherst.

References

External links 
 School of Public Health and Health Sciences official site

University of Massachusetts Amherst schools
University subdivisions in Massachusetts